Francisco Ruiz Gijón (Utrera, 1653 - Seville, 1720) was a Spanish sculptor of the Baroque period. He belongs to the Andalusian school, following the style of Pedro Roldán. He studied with sculptor Andrés Cansino and developed his artistic career in Seville.

Works
His works are exclusively religious. He worked for several Catholic churches and brotherhoods. His most important creations are related to the Holy Week processions in Seville.

Imagery
Expiring Christ, known as El Cachorro. The face of this image is a realistic portrait of a famous gypsy of Triana, called El Cachorro, literally meaning Little Puppy. 1682.
Sainte Anne, Church of Santa María Magdalena
Simon of Cyrene, Church of San Isidoro. 1687.
Jesus carrying the cross. Brotherhood of San Isidoro. 1688 (partially lost)
Four Evangelist. Brotherhood of El Museo. 1700. (Atrib.)

Processional Floats
The paso for Jesús del Gran Poder. 1692.
The paso for Cristo del Amor. Church of The Saviour. 1694.

Bibliography
 Roda Peña, José: Francisco Antonio Ruiz Gijón escultor utrerano. Siarum Editores S.C.

References

17th-century Spanish sculptors
Spanish Baroque sculptors
Spanish male sculptors
1653 births
1720 deaths